Vasingtona is a genus of millipedes in the family Caseyidae. There is at least one described species in Vasingtona, V. irritans.

References

Further reading

 
 

Chordeumatida
Millipedes of North America
Articles created by Qbugbot